Agrij is a commune located in Sălaj County, Crișana, Romania. It is composed of two villages, Agrij and Răstolțu Deșert (Pusztarajtolc). It was called Treznea-Agrij from 1988 to 1995, when Treznea and Bozna villages were split off to form Treznea Commune.

Sights 
 Wooden Church in Răstolțu Deșert (built in the 19th century), historic monument

References

Communes in Sălaj County
Localities in Crișana